"All Night" is a song written by Lynsey de Paul and Ron Roker. De Paul released her version of the song on 27 April 1973 as her third single released on MAM Records, with arrangements by Martyn Ford and John Bell and produced by de Paul. It features an uncredited male vocal (repeating the title "All Night" after de Paul sings it). A slinky, sexy song, it compares a love relationship to that of the spider and a fly. The single is backed by the more socially aware song "Blind Leading the Blind", composed and produced by de Paul. The song was an unusual release since neither the A-side or the B-side featured as tracks on her debut album. "Surprise" had been released a little more than a month earlier and this song was in a different style.

As well as being released in the UK, it was issued in France, Germany, Netherlands, Belgium, Portugal, Sweden, Turkey, New Zealand, Japan and the US. Cashbox reviewed the single and wrote "Lynsey's initial Stateside release, “Sugar Me” received wide industry acclaim, and this one is certain to follow in same path. Excellent single for major top 40 programmers is melodic and rhythmic. This will be the one to watch". It was listed as a "Spins & Sales" pick in Record World and also as a "discopick" in "DJ and Radio Monthly" magazine. In his column "Pop Picking" journalist James Craven wrote "Lynsey de Paul should be chart bound soon with her "All Night". I must admit it took one or two plays before coming to this conclusion. It builds up from a quiet start but I must confess Lynsey knows how to handle a lyric." Record Mirror reviewed the single "Noted composer, singer, pianist, producer, arranger, talent scout Lynsey does have style you know. She's got a feel for the right approach in pop, and there is an element of sauciness about her songs which come over well. This one is a persuasive, intriguing sort of performance which registers instantly. Nice one - chart cert". A week later the music paper listed the single as one of Hamilton's Disco Picks and wrote "She “Gets Down” quite sexily, MoR/Pop." Writing in the music newspaper Sounds, English DJ John Peel wrote "a dapper little strutter" about the song. As well as garnering radio plays on BBC Radio, Radio Luxembourg and pirate radio stations, the song was also play listed on Italian radio stations such as "Secondo" (channel 2). 

De Paul appeared on numerous prime time TV shows such as Top of the Pops in the UK on 4 May 1973, Hits-a-Go-Go in Germany on 24 June 1973 (re-screened as an episode of Einsfestival on 28 March 2015), where she performed with Mott The Hoople and Top A Gérard Lenorman in France performing the song. The Top of the Pops version was released on the BBC Transcription Services for broadcast world wide, together with live versions of her songs "Ivory Tower" and "Water". The single was a pirate radio favourite and it reached No. 27 on the Radio North Sea International (RNI) Top 30 in June 1973, No. 17 on the Dutch Single Tip chart and No. 20 on the Turkish singles chart as published by Milliyet. Although it did not appear in the UK Singles Chart, it bubbled under as a chart breaker. In 1974, it was released again in Japan, this time on a four track EP that featured all four de Paul singles on the MAM label.

Even though it was originally a non-album single, it has since been released on almost every de Paul compilation album, such as Lynsey Sings aka The World of Lynsey De Paul, and the German album Profile. A version that is longer than the one appearing as the single and that referenced "Sugar Me" was released on the album Greatest Hits, and in remastered form on Sugar and Beyond. In the accompanying booklet to Sugar and Beyond, de Paul revealed it was not one of her own favourite compositions. Nevertheless, AllMusic lists "All Night" as one of de Paul's song highlights.

The song was recorded with Japanese lyrics by singer/actress Jun Fubuki (real name Reiko Horikawa) as "Futari No Hodou",  which was released as a single as well as an album track in Japan in 1974 and also on the 2012 CD collection Golden Best: Jun Fubuki. She performed the song on the Japanese TV show, 風吹ジュン - 二人の舗道,  in 1975.

In 2019, it was included as a track on Denim & Diamante vol. 1, a selection of 1970s glam pop and discotheque rock, mixed by Denim Disco. In 2020, it comprised one of the tracks on I Start Counting #10, an album compiled by Saint Etienne. It still receives airplay, notably in the US as recently as 2021.

References

1973 singles
Songs written by Lynsey de Paul
Lynsey de Paul songs
Songs written by Ron Roker
MAM Records singles
1973 songs